Migori was an electoral constituency in Kenya. It is one of eight constituencies of Migori County. The constituency was established for the 1963 elections. In 2013, the constituency was divided into Suna West and Suna East.

Members of Parliament

Wards

References 

Migori County
Constituencies in Nyanza Province
1963 establishments in Kenya
2013 disestablishments in Kenya
Constituencies established in 1963
Constituencies disestablished in 2013